This is a list of all teams and players who have won the Cork Senior Football Championship since its inception in 1887.

By team

By year

References

List of Cork Senior Football Championship winners